is a Japanese politician serving in the House of Representatives in the Diet (national legislature) as a member of the Democratic Party of Japan. A native of Tokyo and graduate of Meiji University he was elected for the first time in 2003.

References

External links
  Official website in Japanese.

Living people
1970 births
Democratic Party of Japan politicians
Members of the House of Representatives (Japan)
21st-century Japanese politicians